Sun Jinfang (born 6 April 1955 in Suzhou) is a Chinese former volleyball player who played the setter position. She captained China to the gold medal at both the 1981 FIVB Women's World Cup and the 1982 FIVB Women's World Championship. She also won a silver medal at the 1978 Asian Games and a gold medal at the 1982 Asian Games.

She became the director of China's tennis program in 2003.

Individual accolades
MVP, 1981 FIVB Women's World Cup
Best setter, 1981 FIVB Women's World Cup

Popular culture
Volleyball player Chen Zhan played Sun Jinfang in the 2020 film Leap.

References

1955 births
Volleyball players from Jiangsu
Sportspeople from Suzhou
Living people
Chinese women's volleyball players
Asian Games medalists in volleyball
Volleyball players at the 1978 Asian Games
Volleyball players at the 1982 Asian Games
Medalists at the 1978 Asian Games
Medalists at the 1982 Asian Games
Asian Games gold medalists for China
Asian Games silver medalists for China
20th-century Chinese women